ENM may refer to:

 École nationale de la météorologie, a renowned French graduate engineering school specializing in meteorology
 Emmonak Airport (FAA LID: ENM), a state-owned public-use airport located in Emmonak, Alaska
 Escuela Naval Militar, a coeducational Naval Academy that educates officers for commissioning 
 French National School for the Judiciary (École nationale de la magistrature), a French post-graduate school
 Middle English (ISO 639-2 & -3: enm), a form of the English language spoken after the Norman conquest until the late 15th century
 Species distribution modelling (also environmental niche modelling), the use of computer algorithms to predict the distribution of a species across geographic space and time
 United National Movement (Georgia) (Ertiani Natsionaluri Modzraoba), a political party in Georgia
 Ethical non-monogamy, also known as consensual non-monogamy, a style of intimate or sexual relationship